Yongle (23 January 1403 – 19 January 1425) was the era name of the Yongle Emperor, the third emperor of the Ming dynasty of China, and was used for a total of twenty-two years. During the Yongle period, the Ming dynasty was powerful and prosperous, and the economy continued to develop. It was known in historiography as the "Prosperous Age of Yongle" (永樂盛世).

The Yongle Emperor was originally the Prince of Yan (燕王). In 1402 (Jianwen 4), he seized the throne in the Jingnan campaign and changed "Jianwen 4" (建文四年, "the fourth year of the Jianwen era") to "Hongwu 35" (洪武三十五年, "the thirty-fifth year of the Hongwu era"). Initially, the era name of the following year was originally planned to be "Yongqing" (永清), but the era name was later changed to "Yongle".

On 7 September 1424 (Yongle 22, 15th day of the 8th month), the Hongxi Emperor ascended to the throne and continued to use the Yongle era name. The era was changed to Hongxi in the following year.

Comparison table

Other regime era names that existed during the same period
 Vietnam
 Thiệu Thành (紹成, 1401–1402): Hồ dynasty — era name of Hồ Hán Thương
 Khai Đại (開大, 1403–1407): Hồ dynasty — era name of Hồ Hán Thương
 Hưng Khánh (興慶, 1407–1409): Later Trần dynasty — era name of Trần Ngỗi
 Trùng Quang (重光, 1409–1413): Later Trần dynasty — era name of Trần Quý Khoáng
 Vĩnh Ninh (永寧, 1419–1420): Jiaozhi Province — era name of Phạm Ngọc (范玉)
 Vĩnh Thiên (永天, 1420): Jiaozhi Province — era name of Lê Ngạ (黎餓)
 Japan
 Ōei (応永, 1394–1428): Japan — era name of Emperor Go-Komatsu and Emperor Shōkō

See also
 List of Chinese era names
 List of Ming dynasty era names

References

Further reading

Ming dynasty eras